XHUANT-FM is a Mexican college radio station owned by the Universidad Autónoma de Nayarit in Tepic.

History
XHUANT received its permit on May 10, 2006 and signed on that day.

References

Radio stations in Nayarit
University radio stations in Mexico